Kaikohe Hill (also Tokareireia) is a 282 m high basaltic scoria cone in the Kaikohe-Bay of Islands volcanic field in New Zealand. It is on the western edge of the town of Kaikohe.

References

Geological Society of New Zealand

External links
 View from near the Hone Heke Memorial, on Kaikohe Hill.

Far North District
Volcanoes of the Northland Region
Kaikohe